De Soto is a census-designated place and unincorporated community in Clarke County, Mississippi, United States.

It was first named as a CDP in the 2020 Census which listed a population of 274.

History
De Soto was named after Hernando de Soto.
De Soto was one of four principle towns established in Clarke County before the American Civil War. Established along the Chickasawhay River before the arrival of the Mobile and Ohio Railroad, construction of housing in De Soto may have started as early as 1845 and by 1858 churches were being erected. The town had a Post Office and two churches in 1900 when the population was 258.

A post office operated under the name De Soto from 1856 to 1978.

At one point, De Soto was home to two sawmills, a drug store, a hotel, a blacksmith, and multiple general stores.

Four sites in De Soto are listed on the National Register of Historic Places: the C. V. Akin House, the Carmichael House, the Cook-Sellers House, and the Covington House.

Demographics

2020 census

Note: the US Census treats Hispanic/Latino as an ethnic category. This table excludes Latinos from the racial categories and assigns them to a separate category. Hispanics/Latinos can be of any race.

References

Unincorporated communities in Clarke County, Mississippi
Unincorporated communities in Mississippi
Census-designated places in Clarke County, Mississippi